Penicillium gracilentum is a species of the genus of Penicillium.

References

gracilentum
Fungi described in 1973